Pyrgacris is a small genus of grasshoppers in the monotypic family Pyrgacrididae. The two species in the genus Pyrgacris are found only on Reunion Island.

Species
, Orthoptera Species File lists:
 Pyrgacris descampsi Kevan, 1976
 Pyrgacris relictus Descamps, 1968 - type species

References

Caelifera
Orthoptera genera